The Archaic Abattoir is the fourth album by death metal group Aborted. The track "Dead Wreckoning" contains audio samples from American Psycho, and the song "Threading on Vermillion Deception" contains audio from the film Blade.

The album was re-released in 2009, with two songs from The Haematobic EP as bonus tracks.

Track listing

Personnel
Sven "Svencho" de Caluwé – vocals
Bart Vergaert – guitars
Thijs De Cloedt – guitars
Frederik Vanmassenhove – bass
Gilles Delecroix – drums
Michael Bogballe (Mnemic) – vocals (1)
Bo Summer (Illdisposed) – vocals (5, 6)
Jacob Bredahl (Hatesphere) – vocals (8)

References 

2005 albums
Aborted (band) albums
Listenable Records albums
Albums produced by Tue Madsen